Enrique de Heriz (1964-2019) was a Spanish writer. Born in Barcelona, he studies Spanish Philology at the University of Barcelona. At an early age, he achieved prominence as a translator and an editor. Among the authors whose books he helped produce in Spanish are Annie Proulx, Nadine Gordimer, Stephen King, Peter Carey, and John Fowles. 

In 2000, he left his job at Ediciones B and became a full-time writer and wrote a series of acclaimed novels, among them Lies and The Manual of Darkness. Lies was translated into English by John Cullen and nominated for the Premio Valle Inclan. 

Heriz died of lung cancer in 2019. He left behind his wife Yolanda and two children.

References

1964 births
2019 deaths
Spanish male writers
Writers from Barcelona